Harman Blennerhassett (8 October 1765 – 2 February 1831) was an Anglo-Irish lawyer, a member of the Society of United Irishmen who emigrated in advance of their rebellion in 1798 to become a socially and politically distinguished plantation owner in then-western Virginia. Implicated in the Burr conspiracy, an alleged military plot with Britain to separate the Louisiana Territory from the American union, he was twice arrested and financially ruined.  His last years were spent in England.

Life
Harman Blennerhassett was born in Hampshire, England, to Conway Blennerhassett and his wife, Elizabeth Lacy. He was the grandson of Conway Blennerhassett and the great-great-grandson of Captain Robert Blennerhassett. At the age of two, Harman returned to the family's home in County Kerry, Ireland, a 7,000-acre estate called Castle Conway. As an adolescent, he was sent to Westminster School in London, and in 1784 entered the Middle Temple of London's famous Inns of Court. In 1790, he was graduated from Trinity College, Dublin with a Bachelor of Laws, and started his practice at the Irish bar. Blennerhassett visited Paris in 1790; inherited the family estate in 1792; joined the secret Society of United Irishmen in 1793, which initially dedicated itself to reform, but later turned militantly radical; and in 1794 married Margaret Agnew, daughter of his sister Catherine and Major Robert Agnew, a career officer in the British army.

Chiefly to escape involvement in the United Irishmen's planned rebellion against British rule, but also to conceal his incestuous marriage, Blennerhassett emigrated to the United States in 1796. It became the site of a European-style estate whose centerpiece was an enormous mansion surrounded by extravagantly landscaped lawns and gardens. For a brief period, the Blennerhassetts' home became famous as the largest, most beautiful private residence in the American West.

The most distinguished of the Blennerhassetts' many visitors was the former vice president of the United States, Aaron Burr. His three stays on the island resulted in its becoming headquarters for his mysterious 1806–1807 military expedition to the Southwest, an alleged scheme to separate the Louisiana Territory from the American union with the assistance of the British.

As the result of the president's call for the arrest of Burr, Blennerhassett, and their ca. 70 followers, the mansion and island were occupied and plundered in December 1806 by local Virginia militia. Blennerhassett fled, was twice arrested, and finally imprisoned in the Virginia state penitentiary. He was only released following Burr's acquittal at the end of a long 1807 treason trial at Richmond, Virginia. The Blennerhassetts never returned to their island home, which in 1811 was destroyed by fire.

Now forced to earn a living for himself and family, Blennerhassett first settled on a cotton plantation near Port Gibson, Mississippi, where he lost what was left of his once large fortune. Thereafter he unsuccessfully attempted to practice law in Montreal, Lower Canada (1819–1822), and eventually returned to Europe (1824).  Here he initially lived with his family at Bath, England, but later relocated in the Channel Islands where he died in 1831.

The Blennerhassetts had six children: five biological, with three borne on the island and two while in Mississippi, and one adopted.  Of the biological children, three survived infancy, all sons.

The Blennerhassetts' island mansion was reconstructed 1984–1991 by the State of West Virginia, which now operates the site as a state park, Blennerhassett Island Historical State Park.

See also
 Blennerhassett Island Historical State Park
 Margaret Agnew Blennerhassett

Notes

References
Attribution

 Endnotes: 
Hickson's Selections from Old Kerry Records, 1872; 
Reports of Trial of Colonel Aaron Burr, late President of the United States; 
Safford's Life of Harman Blennerhasset, 1853; 
Safford, The Blennerhasset Papers, embodying the Private Journal of Harman Blennerhasset. 1864.

Sources
 Burke, Micheal. "A Chronicle of the Life of Harman Blennerhassett." West Virginia Historical Society Quarterly Vol. XIII, No. 1, January 1999. West Virginia Historical Society
 Swick, Ray. "Harman Blennerhassett: Irish Aristocrat and Frontier Entrepreneur." Essays In History. Volume 14, (1968–1969) The History Club Corcoran Department of History, University of Virginia, pp. 51–71.blennerhassett.net Accessed 6 September 2007
Swick, Ray. "Aaron Burr's Visit to Blennerhassett Island", West Virginia History A Quarterly Vol. XXXV, No. 3, April 1974.
 Swick, Ray. An Island Called Eden: The Story of Harman and Margaret Blennerhassett (Parkersburg, West Virginia: Parkersburg Printing Company, 2000) Printed for Blennerhassett Island Historical State Park.

External links

Official Blennerhassett Island and Museum Homepage
Articles on the Blennerhassetts
Blennerhassett papers
 

1765 births
1831 deaths
Irish emigrants to the United States (before 1923)
Politicians from Parkersburg, West Virginia
People from County Kerry
American planters
Blennerhassett Island
Members of the Middle Temple
Alumni of Trinity College Dublin
People educated at Westminster School, London
United Irishmen
18th-century Anglo-Irish people
Harman